Delvin Brown (born September 17, 1979) is a former American football defensive back. He played for the Jacksonville Jaguars in 2001.

References

1979 births
Living people
American football defensive backs
Miami Hurricanes football players
Jacksonville Jaguars players
Frankfurt Galaxy players